Sopo Shatirishvili  (born 15 January 1995) is a Georgian Olympic shot putter.

Shatirishvili competed at the Athletics at the 2020 Summer Olympics – Women's shot put.

References

External links
 

1995 births
Living people
Female shot putters from Georgia (country)
Olympic athletes of Georgia (country)
Athletes (track and field) at the 2020 Summer Olympics